The Telangana Football Association (abbreviated TFA) is one of the 37 Indian State Football Associations that are affiliated to the All India Football Federation. It administers lower-tier football in the state of Telangana.

Hyderabad Football Association 
The sports federation was formed in 1939 as the Hyderabad Football Association under the initiative of the first secretary Syed Mohammad Hadi. Ghulam Muhammad was elected the first President of HFA and in 1942 Hadi became the President with Syed Abdul Rahim becoming the secretary.

In 1959 under the auspices of the then AIFF Vice-President Shiv Kumar Lal, the Andhra and Hyderabad Football Associations were merged to form the Andhra Pradesh Football Association.

Background 
Telangana Football Association (TFA) is the governing body for football in the state of Telangana. It is based in Hyderabad. Current president is Mohd Rafat Ali and General Secretary is G.P.Palguna.

One of the stalwarts of the Association was Nawab Shujat Ahmed Khan. He was Secretary Andhra Pradesh Football Association 1978–1982. And Manager Indian Football Team to Zambia - 1976.
In the year 1953 he was included in Andhra Pradesh Football Association Executive Committee first time. In 1963 he is made the Assistant Secretary and again in 1964-65 he is made the Joint Secretary. During the period from 1978 to 1982 he was on the responsible post of Secretary and made the Nizam Gold Cup Tournament a respectable and memorable one. He was truthful, straight forward, and righteous person.

Due to his proper management, discipline and leadership qualities the Association became famous throughout India.

See also
Telangana football team

References

External links
 Telangana Football Association at the AIFF

Football governing bodies in India
Football in Telangana
2014 establishments in India
Sports organizations established in 2014